The Airway was an American microcar with two seats, made by Everett Miller and T. P. Hall, and Clarence O Lee was a loaned engineer between 1949 and 1950 in San Diego, California.  It had an all-aluminum body and chassis and an air-cooled 10 hp (7 kW) Onan engine mounted at the back.  Normally it would only use a single fluid-drive speed, plus an emergency low gear.

History 

Hall had attempted several times to make a flying car, but stuck with a more conventional design for this car. The streamlined styling was considered to be modern and quite appealing, and its tiny wheels made the car look larger than it actually was. It used a large amount of aluminum and plastic to reduce its weight. Only two are known to have been made, one of the coupe and one of the sedan, though a number of photographs exist.

Model details 

Body Type – Shipping Weight – Factory Price

2-door Sedan -  - $750 USD

2-door coupe -  - $750 USD

References

External links 
Photo

Microcars
Cars introduced in 1949